Odo III (or Eudes III; died 1148×49) was the bishop of Beauvais from 1144 until his death. Before becoming bishop, he was the Benedictine abbot of the monastery of Saint-Symphorien.

Odo may have attended the consecration of the new Abbey of Saint-Denis in 1144. When he died, the people and canons of Beauvais elected the king's brother, Henry, as bishop. When Hugh Primas attacked the bishop of Beauvais in a poem, he was referring to either Odo III or Henry.

Notes

Sources

1148 deaths
Bishops of Beauvais
Year of birth missing